Mark Shuldham Schreiber, Baron Marlesford (born 11 September 1931) is a British Conservative politician.

Early life

The son of Wing Cdr John Schreiber and Constance Dent, Mark was educated at Sandroyd School, before heading to Eton and Trinity College, Cambridge.

Political career

Schreiber was created a life peer on 7 June 1991 as Baron Marlesford, of Marlesford in the County of Suffolk, where he is a farmer. He did his national service in the Coldstream Guards being commissioned a lieutenant.  He started his commercial life in the chemical industry (Fisons Ltd: 1957–1963). He worked for the Conservative Party Research Department in the 1960s and advised Edward Heath as Leader of the Opposition.  From 1968 to 1970 he was a Councillor on the East Suffolk County Council. From 1970 to 1974 he was a Special Adviser to the Government, mainly working for Lord Rothschild the head of the Central Policy Review Staff (CPRS).  From 1974 to 1991 he was a journalist on The Economist, as parliamentary lobby correspondent.

Rural politics
Since 1991 he has been a Deputy Lieutenant of Suffolk.  From 1980 to 1992, he had been a member of the Countryside Commission 1980–92, and then on the Rural Development Commission 1985–93.

A former national chairman of CPRE (1993–98), he is president of the Suffolk Preservation Society (1998- ) and chairman of the Marlesford Parish Council.

House of Lords
Financial Affairs Sub-Committee 2000-05 and 2010-, Home Affairs Sub-Committee 2005–09;

Director of the Eastern Group plc 1989–95, Times Newspapers Holdings Ltd (ind nat dir) 1991-, Baring New Russia Fund 1997–2007.  An adviser to the Mitsubishi Corporation International NV 1990–2003,  and to John Swire & Sons 1992–2009.

Some political highlights
In October 2011 he questioned the planned expenditure of £500,000 on bat bridges for the future dual carriageway for the A11 from Thetford to Barton Mills.

On 12 and 13 February 2015, Lord Marlesford took part in the Vacant Residential Property debate in the Lords.

Lord Marlesford is a social conservative.  In favour of hunting with dogs, he has proposed to overturn the ban. This conservatism extends to political integration in Europe, and a referendum on membership.  And he is all in favour of students paying their own way.  When the Prime Minister proposed a reduction in the number of MPs he was enthusiastic, but has erred on the side of moderate improvement to controls over people.  No changes to the asylum system, and against ID cards, he is moderately against allowing more interference in personal lives.

Family life
According to his own statements, his Great-Grandmother was Greek and a niece of Ioannis Kapodistrias. He married Gabriella Veglio di Castelletto d'Uzzone, daughter of Conte Veglio di Castelletto d'Uzzone in 1969. He is the father of two daughters, Nicola Charlotte and Sophie Louisa. He has four grandchildren.

References

Sources
http://www.parliament.uk/mpslordsandoffices/mps_and_lords/alphabetical_list_of_members.cfm#M
http://hansard.millbanksystems.com/people/mr-mark-schreiber
https://web.archive.org/web/20080510175243/http://www.dodonline.co.uk/engine.asp?lev1=4&lev2=38&menu=81&biog=y&id=26528
https://web.archive.org/web/20050520082930/http://www.cracroftspeerage.co.uk/rolls/peerage/lifebarons.htm
http://www.ukwhoswho.com/view/article/oupww/whoswho/U26646, accessed 16 Aug 2010
http://www.buryfreepress.co.uk/news/crime-and-courts/peer_blasts_500_000_bat_bridges_proposal_1_3172297

1931 births
People educated at Sandroyd School
People educated at Eton College
Alumni of Trinity College, Cambridge
Conservative Party (UK) life peers
Members of East Suffolk County Council
Living people
Life peers created by Elizabeth II